Iglesia de San Miguel (Villardeveyo) is a church in Asturias, Spain. The church while founded in the 9th century, was rebuilt in its present form in 1884. It retains a window grill from the earlier church.

See also
Asturian art
Catholic Church in Spain
Churches in Asturias
List of oldest church buildings

References

Churches in Asturias
Roman Catholic churches completed in 1884
19th-century Roman Catholic church buildings in Spain